Carlos María Fitz-James Stuart y Palafox, 16th Duke of Alba, 9th Duke of Berwick GE (December 4, 1849 – October 15, 1901) was a Spanish nobleman and diplomat, who held, amongst others, the Dukedom of Alba and Berwick.

Biography 

He was born at Madrid, the only son of Jacobo Fitz-James Stuart, 15th Duke of Alba. His mother Maria Francesca was the daughter of Cipriano de Palafox y Portocarrero, Duke of Peñaranda, and sister of Eugénie de Montijo, Empress of the French. 
During his father's lifetime he was styled Duke of Huéscar. On 16 September 1860 he succeeded his mother in all her titles except the Marquisate of the Bañeza and the Viscountcy of Palacios de la Valduerna, and on 10 July 1881 he succeeded to all his father's titles except the Dukedom of Galisteo, which went to his sister Maria de la Asuncíon Rosalia, 18th Duchess of Galisteo. As a result of this inheritance the Duke of Alba was a Grandee of the first class twelve times over. As heir-male of James FitzJames, 1st Duke of Berwick he also claimed the English title of Duke of Berwick, and used the title when staying with Queen Victoria at Balmoral Castle.

He married Maria del Rosario, 22nd Countess of Siruela on 10 December 1877 at Madrid. She was herself a Grandee of the first class, and daughter of Manuel Pascual Luis Carlós Felix Fortunato Falcó, Marquis of Almonazir by his wife Maria del Pilar, 3rd Duchess of Fernan Nuñez. His wife was born at Pau on 3 October 1854 and died at Paris on 27 March 1904.

They had 3 children:
 Jacobo Fitz-James Stuart, 17th Duke of Alba
 Eugenia Sol María del Pilar, married the Duke of Santoña, Lady-in-waiting of Queen Victoria Eugenia.
 Hernando Fitz-James Stuart, 18th Duke of Peñaranda de Duero.

Like his father, he was educated at the Salamanca University and the military school of Paris. He was Spanish Ambassador in Brussels between 1872 and 1878, and in Saint Petersburg until 1885. Between 1887 and 1894 he was Grand Treasurer of Spain and diplomat in Istanbul. In 1895, he founded the Real Club de la Puerta de Hierro along with a group of distinguished Spanish nobles and King Alfonso XIII of Spain.

The Duke of Alba was also a Senator of the Kingdom, Chamberlain to the Queen Regent Christina, and a Knight of the Golden Fleece. He died from cancer as Spanish Ambassador in the US in New York, aboard Sir Thomas Lipton's yacht, aged 51.

Ancestry

References

 George Edward Cokayne, ed. Vicary Gibbs, The Complete Peerage, volume II (London, 1912) page 167

Titles

1849 births
1901 deaths
Dukes of Spain
Carlos Maria
Carlos Maria
Members of the Senate of Spain
Knights of the Golden Fleece
Marquesses of Carpio
Berwick, Carlos María Fitz-James Stuart, 9th Duke of
Deaths from cancer in New York (state)
19th-century Spanish nobility